Pidkamin is an urban-type settlement in Zolochiv Raion (district), Lviv oblast in Ukraine. It is located near the administrative border of three oblasts, Lviv, Rivne, and Ternopil. Pidkamin hosts the administration of Pidkamin settlement hromada, one of the hromadas of Ukraine. Population:

Description

The village takes its name (translatable into English as "below the rock") from an inselberg called the "Rozhanytsia" or "Devil's Rock", which is located on an adjacent hill. Pidkamin became known for a Dominican monastery. It was established by twelve monks from a monastery established by Saint Hyacinth in Kyiv who were forced to flee from the city when it was ravaged by Mongols (in 1240). Prior Urban and 12 monks were martyred by Tatars in 1245. In the second half of the 15th century wasteland around the place where the  monastery had been, was in possession of nobleman Petrus Cebrovscii who founded the town. With his assistance on the mountain was built a castle and a Latin Catholic church. Knowing the stories about being here before the Dominican monastery, he went to Lviv archbishop asking that he sent to Pidkamin monks. Monastery was reestablished in 1464 by the Latin Church Archbishop of Lviv Gregory of Sanok, who himself came to the feast of the Assumption of the Virgin Mary monks came to the Latin Church of the Assumption of the Virgin Mary, St Cross, Peter and Paul and all the saints.

In 1519 after the devastation Pidkamin passed in possession nobleman Marcin Kamenecki.

In the 17th century a fortified abbey was constructed. Pidkamin hosted a miraculous icon of the Blessed Virgin Mary (a copy of the famous Protectress of the Roman People from the Santa Maria Maggiore Basilica in Rome), crowned in 1727 by the Latin Church bishop of Lutsk Stefan Rupniewski, assisted by other Latin and Ruthenian Catholic bishops, with a crown conferred by Pope Benedict XIII. After the region came under Austrian rule in 1772 the monastery suffered from the policies of Emperor Joseph II, and although saved by the emperor's death, it never regained its former significance. In 1915, Pidkamin was largely destroyed by Russian artillery. The icon was again crowned in 1927 by the Latin Church Metropolitan of Lviv Bolesław Twardowski and in 1959 by the Cardinal Primate of Poland Stefan Wyszyński.

During the Massacres of Poles in Volhynia, Pidkamin was a shelter for Poles, who escaped there to hide in the monastery. Some 2,000 people, the majority of whom were women and children, were living there when the monastery was attacked in mid-March 1944, by the Ukrainian Insurgent Army, cooperating with the Ukrainian SS. Around 300 Poles were murdered in the monastery, and additional 500 were killed in the town of Pidkamin itself. In the nearby village of Palikrovy, 300 Poles were killed, 20 in Maliniska and 16 in Chernytsia. Armed Ukrainian groups destroyed the monastery, stealing all valuables, except for the monastery's crowned icon.

After World War II the icon was removed from Pidkamin to rescue it from communists and today remains in the Dominican church of St Adalbert in Wrocław, Poland. In 1946 the monastery was closed by the Soviets and turned into a jail. Among the inmates was the Blessed Priest and Martyr Nicholas Tsehelskyj. Later the monastery was used as psychiatric hospital, which still exists, and the church was turned into a stable. After the dissolution of the Soviet Union and the emergence of independent Ukraine, the ruins of the monastery were given to Ukrainian Greek Catholic Studite Brethren.

From 1940 to 1959 Pidkamin was an administrative center of Pidkamin Raion. Until 18 July 2020, it belonged to Brody Raion. The raion was abolished in July 2020 as part of the administrative reform of Ukraine, which reduced the number of raions of Lviv Oblast to seven. The area of Brody Raion was merged into Zolochiv Raion.

Jewish population 
Prior to the Second World War Pidkamin had a Jewish population that was tragically murdered during the Holocaust by German Nazis.

People associated with Pidkamin 

 Petrus Cebrovscii, benefactor of Pidkamin Dominican Monastery 
 Leopold Buczkowski (1905–1989), Polish writer, artist.
 Stefan Aleksander Potocki (buried in Pidkamin), a voivode of Belz (1720-1726), a founder of Basilian monastery in Buchach, father of Mikołaj Bazyli Potocki.
 Sadok Barącz, Latin Church religious leader, historian, folklorist, archivist, an Armenian by nationality, the prior of Dominican Monastery.

Notes

External links
 , P. 402-406
  Site about Podkamień 
  Ethnographical festival in Pidkamin 
  About Pidkamin 
  History of Pidkamin 
 Photos of Pidkamin

 
Urban-type settlements in Zolochiv Raion
Shrines to the Virgin Mary
Holocaust locations in Ukraine